Armin Görtz (born 30 August 1959) is a German former professional footballer who played as a midfielder.

Career
Görtz played top-flight football in (West) Germany and Belgium.

He won two caps for the West Germany national team in 1988.

References

External links
 
 
 
 

1959 births
Living people
Footballers from Dortmund
German footballers
Association football midfielders
Germany international footballers
Bundesliga players
2. Bundesliga players
Eintracht Frankfurt players
FSV Frankfurt players
K.S.K. Beveren players
1. FC Köln players
Hertha BSC players
Olympic footballers of West Germany
West German footballers
Footballers at the 1988 Summer Olympics
Olympic bronze medalists for West Germany
Olympic medalists in football
Medalists at the 1988 Summer Olympics